Zainab Gimba (born 25 December 1972) is a Nigerian politician. She was elected to the Nigerian House of Representatives as a candidate of the ruling party APC in the federal constituency of Bama/Ngala/Kala Balge constituency, Borno State. She is a member of Commonwealth Women Parliamentarians (CWP) and advocates for representation and maintenance of gender equality.

Education 
Zainab has a BS.c in Public Administration. She also furthered her education and acquired a Master's degree in Public Administration. 
She has a PhD in Public Administration and Policy Analysis.

Career 
The period 2011 to 2014, she served as the Hon. Commissioner Ministry of Poverty Alleviation and youth Empowermentin Borno state. She also served as the Hon. Commissioner Borno State Universal Basic Education Board from 2014 to 2015. She was appointed as the Hon. Commissioner Ministry of Water Resources Borno State in 2015 and served till 2018.

During the 64th Commonwealth Parliamentary Conference (CPC) at Speke Resort Munyonyo, Kampala in 2019, Zainab was elected vice president of the Commonwealth Women Parliamentarian (CWP) Africa region.

Awards 
Certificate of Merit Award by National Youth Service Corps (NYSC) Yobe state in recognition of her excellent performance in CDS and primary assignment, 2000.
Award of leadership excellence by Rotary club of Maiduguri city, April 2018
Award of excellence by Ngala students association (NGALSA) for her humanitarian service. 29 April 2018.
Award by West Africa Water Expo for her support to West Africa WAWE Expo 2018.

References

External links 
HONOURABLE DR. ZAINAB GIMBA
Borno's only female Legislator shares 318 vehicles, 1,692 empowerment tools to constituents.
Borno’s only female APC candidate speaks on rough road to victory.

Members of the House of Representatives (Nigeria)
Women members of the House of Representatives (Nigeria)
All Progressives Congress politicians
People from Borno State
Living people
1972 births
21st-century Nigerian politicians
21st-century Nigerian women politicians